Sergio Garrone (born 15 April 1925) is an Italian director, screenwriter and film producer.

Life and career 
Born in Rome, the brother of the actor Riccardo, Garrone began his career in 1948 working as assistant director, documentary filmmaker, and production assistant. In 1953, he abandoned the cinema industry, but in 1965 he resurfaced as a producer of low-budget genre films. Starting from 1968, Garrone was also active as a director and a screenwriter, specializing in the Spaghetti Western genre. He was usually credited as Willy S. Regan.

Selected filmography  

Director and screenwriter
 A Noose for Django (1969) 
 Django the Bastard (1969) 
La colomba non deve volare (1970)
 Kill Django... Kill First (1971)
 Terrible Day of the Big Gundown (1971) 
 Lover of the Monster (1974)
 The Hand That Feeds the Dead (1974)
 SS Experiment Camp (1976) 

Screenwriter 
 Death Knocks Twice (1969)
 Five for Hell (1969)
 The Big Bust Out (1972) 
 La pagella (1980)

References

External links 
 
 

1925 births 
20th-century Italian people 
Italian film directors 
Italian screenwriters
Italian male screenwriters
Film people from Rome
Living people